This is a list of common dog crossbreeds. These are crossbreed dogs created deliberately by crossing two purebred dogs. Some are known as designer dogs and are bred as companion dogs, often given portmanteau names derived from those of the parent breeds; others are bred to combine specific working qualities inherent in the parent breeds.

Crossbreeds
{| class="wikitable"
!Name||Picture||Parent breeds and notes
|-
|American Staghound||||Cross of different sighthound breeds; bred in the United States as hunting dogs.
|-
|Beaglier||||Cross of a beagle and a Cavalier King Charles Spaniel; first deliberately bred in the 1990s by designer dog breeders in Australia as a companion dog with the aim of reducing the scent-hunting drive common in beagles.
|-
|Cavoodle or Cavapoo||||Cross of a Cavalier King Charles Spaniel and a Poodle; first deliberately bred by designer dog breeders in Australia as a companion dog with similar traits to the Cockapoo, but in a smaller size.
|-
| Chiweenie||||Cross of a Chihuahua and a Dachshund.  
|-
| Chorkie||||Cross of a Chihuahua and a Yorkshire Terrier.
|-
| Chug ||  ||Cross of a Chihuahua and a Pug.
|-
|Cockapoo||||Cross of a Cocker Spaniel and a Miniature Poodle; bred as companion dogs. Cocker Spaniels and Poodles have been deliberately crossed by designer dog breeders in the United States from the 1960s onward.
|-
|Cojack
|
|Cross of a Jack Russell Terrier and a Pembroke Welsh Corgi.
|-
| Daniff ||  || Cross of a Great Dane and a Mastiff.
|-
|Dorgi||||Cross of a Dachshund and a Pembroke Welsh Corgi; they were first bred when one of Queen Elizabeth's Corgis mated with Pipkin, a Dachshund that belonged to Princess Margaret; the Queen found them so appealing that a number of subsequent matings were arranged.
|-
|Eurohound||||Cross of an Alaskan Husky and various Pointers.
|-
|Feist || ||Cross of a Greyhound or Whippet with some sort of Terrier.  Bred in the United States as a squirrel dog or ratter.
|-
|Gerberian Shepsky||||Cross of a German Shepherd and a Siberian Husky; it has the German Shepherd's upright ears and coat colour and the Siberian Husky's thick coat, marginally wider face and mask.
|-
|Goldador||||Cross of a Golden Retriever and a Labrador Retriever; examples have been used as guide dogs, search and rescue dogs, and drug detection dogs, as well as companion dogs.
|-
|Goldendoodle||||Cross of a Golden Retriever and a Poodle. Bred as a companion dog, designer dog breeders in Australia and the United States first started deliberately crossing Golden Retrievers with Standard Poodles in the 1990s as an alternative to the Labradoodle.
|-
| Jackabee||||Cross of a Jack Russell Terrier and a beagle.
|-
| Jack Tzu||||Cross of a Jack Russell Terrier and a Shih Tzu.
|-
| Jug||||Cross of a Jack Russell Terrier and a Pug.
|-
|Kangaroo dog||||Cross of different sighthound breeds; bred in Australia for hunting ability.
|-
|Labradoodle||||Cross of a Labrador Retriever and a Poodle; first bred in Australia in the 1980s with the hope of creating a guide dog suitable for blind people that are allergic to dog hair; now a popular companion dog.
|-
|Longdog||||Cross of different sighthound breeds; bred in the British Isles as hunting dogs.
|-
|Lurcher||||Traditionally a cross of a Collie and a Greyhound, but can be any herding dog (including a Rhodesian Ridgeback) or terrier crossed with a sighthound; bred in the British Isles as hunting dogs.
|-
|Mal-shi||||Cross of a Maltese and a Shih Tzu; first deliberately bred by Australian designer dog breeders in the 1990s as companion dogs.
|-
|Maltipoo||||Cross of a Maltese and a Poodle
|-
|Mountain Cur|||||Hunting dog for squirrels and raccoons, crossbreed.
|-
|Peekapoo||||Cross of a Pekingese and a Poodle.
|-
|-
|Poochon||||Cross of a Poodle and a Bichon Frisé.
|-
|Puggle||||Cross of a Pug and a beagle.
|-
|Schnoodle||||Cross of a Schnauzer and a Poodle; bred as companion dogs from the 1980s onward, they can be bred from Miniature, Standard or Giant Schnauzers crossed with Toy, Miniature or Standard Poodles, respectively; the offspring vary in size according to the various parent size varieties bred.
|-
| Sheepadoodle||||Cross of an Old English Sheepdog and a Poodle.
|-
|-
|-
|Texas Heeler||||Cross of an Australian Cattle Dog (a.k.a. Blue Heeler) and either an Australian Shepherd or a Border Collie; bred in the United States for the crosses’ ability to work cattle.
|-
|Westiepoo||||Cross of a West Highland White Terrier and a Poodle.
|-
|Yorkiepoo||||Cross of a Yorkshire Terrier and a Poodle; bred as a companion dog; the Yorkiepoo, despite variations, is one of the smallest poodle crossbreeds produced by designer dog breeders.
|-
|Zuchon||||Cross of a Shih Tzu and a Bichon Frisé; bred as a companion dog.
|-
|}

See also
 Dog crossbreed
 List of dog breeds
 Mongrel

References

Citations

General and cited references 
 
 
 
  
 
 
 
 
 
 
 
 
 
 
 
 
 
 
 
 

Crossbreeds
Lists of breeds